The East Lancs OmniDekka (later sold as the Darwen OmniDekka and Optare OmniDekka) is a double-decker bus built for sale in the UK market, introduced by East Lancashire Coachbuilders in 2003. Originally built on Scania N94UD chassis at Euro 3, and later Scania N230UD and N270UD at Euro 4 and Euro 5, the bodywork consists of a modified East Lancs Myllennium double decker, but with the standard front end cowl and windscreen replaced with that of Scania's own integral OmniCity. Through takeovers of East Lancs, production of the OmniDekka was latterly carried out by the Darwen Group and finally Optare before ceasing in 2011.

History

Collaboration with Scania 
Scania was late in bringing a low-floor double-deck chassis to the market, having previously only sold low floor single deckers mainly bodied by Wright, which included the N113CRL/Wright Pathfinder (also with East Lancs MaxCi bodywork), the L113CRL/Wright Axcess-Ultralow, the L94UB/Wright Axcess-Floline, the L94UB/Wright Solar and then latterly the integral OmniCity product on CN94UB chassis. It had however worked with East Lancs some years prior in 1995 to produce a high-floor step entrance double decker on the N113DRB chassis, this being the Cityzen.

In 2002, East Lancashire Coachbuilders bodied a batch of short wheelbase N94UB chassis with Myllennium bodywork (at this point still with the original design) for London Easylink. The OmniTown midibus was to be a further development of this product, modifying the front end panelling to resemble that of an OmniCity. A year later in March 2003, the OmniDekka was finally unveiled - the first examples (being of the 10.6m short wheelbase and of dual door layout) going to Metrobus in south east London. A near identical batch for Brighton & Hove (only differing in being single door) followed this in the May, along with the first 11.9m long wheelbase examples, which went to Nottingham City Transport in the September of that year.

Eventually, the OmniDekka became commonplace across the UK, being featured in the fleets of numerous London operators, as well as the provincial operations of Stagecoach, and from 2005, First, who had previously failed in getting Wrightbus to body the N94UD, citing body to chassis weight distribution issues with the Gemini bodywork.In November 2006, the bus was officially replaced in East Lancs’ product range by the Olympus model on the then-new Scania N-series chassis at Euro 4 emissions certification. The Olympus was not as successful as had been hoped; around a year earlier, Scania had soft launched a double decker version of their integral OmniCity, which at Euro 4 would go into full production and ultimately replace the East Lancs effort as the Scania vehicle of choice, especially amongst London operators.

From this point onwards, the OmniDekka was not on general sale, subsequent vehicles generally only being built for existing customers.

Darwen takeover 
With the collapse of East Lancs in August 2007, the assets were purchased by the Darwen Group, who quickly rebranded the former product range with their own badge and name, however this was short lived; a year later in June 2008, the assets of Optare were acquired in a ‘reverse takeover’, once again the former East Lancs product range was rebadged, this time with the branding of Optare.

Customers 

Many of its original customers became repeat buyers, most notably Nottingham City Transport, who by the mid 2000s had begun to standardise its fleet with this model, purchasing 84 11.9m examples on N94UD chassis, along with a further 40 on N270UD (Euro 4) and 50 on N230UD (Euro 5) chassis - the last batch of these in November 2011 (on ’61’ plates) also being the final ever buses built at the former East Lancs factory in Blackburn, which by this point, was under the badge of Optare.

End of production 
Shortly after  the Blackburn site was closed for good in 2012, all subsequently all double deck body-on-chassis products were discontinued; Optare preferring to focus on its integral range at a new facility in Sherburn-in-Elmet, of which in time it intended to add a new double deck product too, in 2014 being unveiled as the MetroDecker.

The spiritual successor to the Scania chassis products however, came from rival Alexander Dennis, who began offering their Enviro400 and later Enviro400 MMC and City bodywork styles on the N-series chassis.

See also 

Competitors:
 Alexander Dennis Enviro400
 Dennis Trident 2
 MAN ND283F
 VDL DB250
 Volvo B7TL
 Volvo B9TL

Other Scania buses sold in the UK:
 L94UB (single decker chassis)
 OmniCity

References 

Double-decker buses
Low-floor buses
East Lancashire Coachbuilders
OmniDekka
Vehicles introduced in 2003

sv:Scania Omni-serien